Cristofer Jesus Ogando  (born October 23, 1993) is a Dominican professional baseball relief pitcher who is a free agent. He has played in Major League Baseball (MLB) for the Tampa Bay Rays. He made his MLB debut in 2022.

Professional career

Miami Marlins and Arizona Diamondbacks organizations
Ogando signed with the Miami Marlins on January 17, 2013, as an international free agent. He made his professional debut for the Dominican Summer League Marlins in 2013, pitching in five games and ending the season with an 8.53 earned run average. After being released by the Marlins on December 17, 2013, he did not play professionally from 2014 to 2017, instead playing in amateur baseball leagues.

He signed with the Arizona Diamondbacks on June 5, 2018. After advancing to the Low-A Hillsboro Hops, he was selected by the Tampa Bay Rays in the minor league phase of the Rule 5 draft on December 13, 2018.

Tampa Bay Rays organization
Ogando split the  season with the Bowling Green Hot Rods and Charlotte Stone Crabs. He missed the entirety of  due to the COVID-19 pandemic's cancellation of the Minor League Baseball season. In , he advanced to the Triple-A level, appearing in one game with the Durham Bulls.  
He began the 2021 season with Durham, pitching in 21 games with a 3.03 ERA.  He was promoted to the majors on July 3, 2022. Ogando made his debut that day against the Toronto Blue Jays, allowing one run in 2.0 innings and striking out Vladimir Guerrero Jr.. He was sent back down to Durham the following day. On July 21, Ogando was designated for assignment following the signing of Roman Quinn. He had his contract selected again on September 23. On September 29, Ogando was designated for assignment. He elected free agency on October 11, 2022.

See also
 List of Major League Baseball players from the Dominican Republic

References

External links

1993 births
Living people
Sportspeople from Santo Domingo
Dominican Republic expatriate baseball players in the United States
Major League Baseball players from the Dominican Republic
Major League Baseball pitchers
Tampa Bay Rays players
Bowling Green Hot Rods players
Charlotte Stone Crabs players
Durham Bulls players
Dominican Summer League Marlins players
Hillsboro Hops players
Missoula Osprey players
Montgomery Biscuits players
Dominican Summer League Diamondbacks players